Officially Namsan Mountain or Mount Namsan, lit. "South Mountain") is a -high peak in Jung-gu, Seoul, South Korea.  Although known as Mongmyeoksan, or 목멱산 /  in the past, it is now commonly referred to as Mt. Namsan.  It offers some hiking, picnic areas and views of downtown Seoul's skyline.  The N Seoul Tower is located on top of Mt. Namsan.

The mountain and its surrounding area is Namsan Park, a public park maintained by the city government, which has panoramic views of Seoul. It is also the location of a smoke signal station called Mongmyeoksan Bongsudae (Mongmyeoksan Beacon Tower, Hangul: 목멱산 봉수대), which was part of an emergency communication system during much of Seoul's history until 1985. From 1925 to 1945 the Shinto shrine known as Chōsen Jingū was situated on Mt. Namsan.

In 2011 a survey was conducted by Seoul Development Institute, which included 800 residents and 103 urban planners and architects. It ranked Mt. Namsan as the most scenic location in Seoul by 62.8 percent of residents and 70.9 percent of the experts surveyed. 

The park and the fountain were used as the filming location for Seoul Broadcasting System (SBS)'s drama Lovers in Paris.

Namsan is mentioned in the second verse of South Korea's National Anthem.

It was first opened on 12 May 1962, and is the longest-running cable car in Korea that has run without a day's rest.

See also
Namsan cable car
List of mountains in Korea
List of parks in Seoul

References

External links
Life In Korea profile
Official English-language site of Namsan Park

Mountains of Seoul
Jung District, Seoul
Yongsan District
Tourist attractions in Seoul